Anne Hathaway's Cottage is a twelve-roomed farmhouse where Anne Hathaway, the wife of William Shakespeare, lived as a child in the village of Shottery, Warwickshire, England, about  west of Stratford-upon-Avon. Spacious, and with several bedrooms, it is now set in extensive gardens.

History
The earliest part of the house was built prior to the 15th century; the higher part is 17th century. As in many houses of the period, it has multiple chimneys to spread the heat evenly throughout the house during winter. The largest chimney was used for cooking. It also has visible timber framing, typical of vernacular Tudor architecture.

After the death of Hathaway's father, the cottage was owned by her brother Bartholomew, and was passed down the Hathaway family until 1846, when financial problems forced them to sell it. However, it was still occupied by them as tenants when it was acquired in 1892 by the Shakespeare Birthplace Trust, which removed later additions and alterations. In 1969 the cottage was badly damaged in a fire, but was restored by the Trust. It is now open to the public as a museum.

Gardens
In 1920, horticulturist Ellen Willmott was commissioned by the Shakespeare Birthplace Trust to advise on design and planting in the garden around the cottage, following the introduction of a large sewer which destroyed the previous garden. Her designs for the flower garden and orchard were intended to compliment the buildings. Many of the plants chosen were mentioned in Shakespeare’s plays, with pastel combination in borders that remain colourful throughout the year. Much of her layout and plant choices are in place today, including the three flower beds near the cottage entrance, named Miss Willmott’s garden.

Replicas

Full size replicas of Anne Hathaway's cottage have been built around the world:

Bedfordale, Western Australia, Australia 
English Inn, Victoria, British Columbia, Canada
Grove Park Inn, Asheville, North Carolina, United States
Odessa College, Texas, United States
Staunton, Virginia, United States
Wessington Springs, South Dakota, United States

Sculpture Trail at Anne Hathaway's cottage and garden

References

Shakespeare Birthplace Trust
Thatched buildings in England
Timber framed buildings in Warwickshire
Grade I listed buildings in Warwickshire
Birthplaces of individual people
Cottages